Lyndel Rowe is an Australian actress of stage, television and film, who is best known for her work with the Melbourne Theatre Company, the Sydney Theatre Company and the State Theatre Company of South Australia, and for her role as Karen Fox/Hamilton in the television soap opera Sons and Daughters.

Career
Ms. Rowe joined the Union Repertory Company (now the Melbourne Theatre Company) - in productions including Patrick White's,  The Season at Sarsaparilla, Waltz of the Toreadors, Arms and the Man, Ghost Train; toured Australia with J.C. Williamson's Goodnight Mrs. Puffin (by Arthur Lovegrove), with Irene Handl.

Travelling to England she studied at the Royal Court Theatre, with George Devine and Keith Johnstone. Then a production with the International Theatre Company of The Seventh Seal (Painting on Wood). From there into repertory and into the company of a West End lunch-time theatre, TheatreScope, doing weekly seasons of one act Tennessee Williams, Ionesco, Anouilh etc.

Invited back to the Melbourne Theatre Company at Russell Street; roles including: Nancy - The Knack, Raymonde - Flea in her Ear, Irina - Three Sisters, Mary Warren - The Crucible, Margery Pinchwife - The Country Wife, Sheila - A Day in the Death of Joe Egg, Sandy - The Prime of Miss Jean Brodie, Clarice - Servant of Two Masters, Marina - Pericles, Pip - Moby Dick, Grace - London Assurance, Charlotte - The Magistrate, Celemene - The Misanthrope, Gwendolyn - The Importance of Being Earnest.

Productions with the Sydney Theatre Company including the roles of: Kate - The Taming of the Shrew, Rose Trelawney - Trelawney of the Wells, Sonya - Uncle Vanya, Marianne - Tartuffe, Charlotte - The Real Thing.

With the South Australian Theatre Company: Phoebe - As You Like It, Daphne - Old King Cole, Jill - David Williamson's Handful of Friends.
At the Playbox, Sydney, played Lucy in the musical - You're a Good Man Charlie Brown. With Nimrod Street (now Belvoir St.), Gwendolyn - Stoppard's Travesties, and an Australian tour of Doctor in Love.

In England with the Liverpool Playhouse:
Anna - Old Times, Dianne - Absent Friends, Raymonde - A Flea in Her Ear.

Filmography

FILM

TELEVISION

Television
 In England, played Fenichka, in BBC's classical series of Turgenev's Fathers and Sons, Guest Episodes of Z-Cars, The Gentle Touch, Kate with Phylis Calvert, BBC play of the month, Death of a Salesman, with Rod Steiger.
 In Australia, the Mini-series, Melba and guest roles in various ABC and Crawfords series. In more recent years she guested in Blue Heelers. Her biggest and most well known TV role was probably that of Karen Fox (later Hamilton) in Grundy's Sons and Daughters in 1984 and 1985.

Ms. Rowe has been awarded a Television Society Award, and a Logie Award.

In 2004 appeared with Lewis Fiander in Afterplay under the direction of Malcolm Robertson, a UTRC veteran, at FortyFive Downstairs, Flinders Lane Melbourne.

Present Interests
Lyndel's other base is London, where she has been writing novels, short stories and a screenplay. She has essays published in Meanjin, and twice chosen for publication in The Best Australian Essays

Notes 

Australian film actresses
Australian stage actresses
Actresses from Melbourne
Living people
Logie Award winners
Year of birth missing (living people)